Janne Juhani Salmi (born 17 April 1969) is a Finnish orienteering competitor, winner of the 1997 World Orienteering Championships, Short distance. World champion Relay 2001, silver medal 1995, 1997 and 1999. Married to Swiss orienteer Vroni König-Salmi.

See also
 Finnish orienteers
 List of orienteers
 List of orienteering events

References

External links
 
 
 

1969 births
Living people
Finnish orienteers
Male orienteers
Foot orienteers
World Orienteering Championships medalists